Tony La Russa's Animal Rescue Foundation (ARF) is a nonprofit organization founded by Elaine and Tony La Russa, based in Walnut Creek, California. ARF rescues dogs and cats from public shelters where they would otherwise be euthanized and adopts them into new homes. Their programs include a spay and neuter clinic, training classes, service dog training for military veterans, a volunteer therapy dog program, and humane education programs for children.

On May 7, 1990, during the opening game for Major League Baseball teams Oakland Athletics and the New York Yankees, a stray cat wandered onto the playing field at Oakland–Alameda County Coliseum. The game was halted as the cat ran around the field. La Russa (then manager of the A's) coaxed the cat into the dugout, and began looking for a local shelter to re-home the cat. Tony and Elaine could not find a shelter, and learned that the cat would most likely be euthanized. They decided to open their own shelter, and in February of the following year, Tony La Russa's Animal Rescue Foundation opened. 

In 2003, the organization moved to Walnut Creek, California, where it is headquartered in a  building. By 2015, ARF reported rescuing 30,000 cats and dogs and spaying or neutering 28,000. The organization also has therapy dogs, which had made 184,000 visits as of 2015. Five years later, in 2020, the organization claimed to have rescued 42,000 cats and dogs and spayed or neutered a similar amount.

References

External links
Animal Rescue Foundation home page

Animal charities based in the United States
Charities based in California
Organizations based in Contra Costa County, California
No kill shelters
1991 establishments in California